Lorenzo Lanzi (born October 26, 1981 in Cesena, Italy) is a professional motorcycle racer most known for competing in the Superbike World championship. He currently competes in the CIV Superbike Championship aboard a BMW S1000RR.

He first started racing in 1996 at the age of 15 in the Italian 125 Sport class, winning the title two years later before moving up to 125GP in the Italian and European championships. In 2001 he moved to 250GP but his season  wasn’t a successful and he was forced to take a one-year break from racing in 2002.

2003 saw him racing for Rox Ducati in the FIM Superstock 1000 Cup. He lost out on the title by three points. In  he moved to the Supersport World Championship riding for Ducati Breil finishing the season in 5th place.

In  Lanzi joined the Caracchi Ducati team in the Superbike World Championship. He had a poor start of the season and injury kept him out of two rounds. A series of 8 successive top ten finishes earned him a promotion at the EuroSpeedway Lausitz round where he raced for the Xerox sponsored Ducati factory team in place of the injured Régis Laconi. He took pole position for the races. In race one he overshot the first corner and had to go down an escape road, seeing him cut several corners. He rejoined third, but had missed enough of the track to earn a ride-through penalty, dropping him down the field, although he fought back to 8th. However, in race 2 he took the win ahead of Chris Vermeulen and Noriyuki Haga. He got his 2nd superbike win at Magny-Cours race 2 later that year.

However, whilst team-mate Troy Bayliss dominated the season, Lanzi did not win any races. He finished the season 8th overall.

He was dropped by the factory Xerox Ducati team for  but continued riding a Ducati, for Team RG. He took victory in Valencia race 1 - he overtook Troy Bayliss for third on the final lap, just before Max Neukirchner and Carlos Checa collided while battling for the lead. However, this was his only top-5 finish of the season, and he came 14th overall.

Career statistics

Grand Prix motorcycle racing

Races by year
(key)

Supersport World Championship

Races by year

Superbike World Championship

Races by year

 * Season still in progress.

References

External links
 lorenzolanzi.it Official Website 

1981 births
Living people
People from Cesena
Italian motorcycle racers
Superbike World Championship riders
Supersport World Championship riders
250cc World Championship riders
FIM Superstock 1000 Cup riders
Sportspeople from the Province of Forlì-Cesena